St. Xavier's School, Nevta, is a private Catholic primary and secondary school located in Nevta, in the Jaipur District of the state of Rajasthan, India. 

The co-educational school was established by the Jesuits in 2015 as a branch school of St. Xavier's Senior Secondary School in Jaipur.  St. Xavier's School, Nevta had grown to include Class XI and was in the process of growing to Class XII, with plans to open by the 2020 session. 

, the school had 3,200+ students enrolled and catered to the needs of students in every aspect, be it academics or non-academics. Within a span of four years, the school has won many inter-school competitions and students of the school have brought laurels at national and international levels. To maintain gender equality, at least 40% of its student enrolments are female.

See also

 List of Jesuit schools
 List of schools in Rajasthan

References  

Jesuit primary schools in India
Private schools in Rajasthan
Christian schools in Rajasthan
Nevta
Educational institutions established in 1941
1941 establishments in India
Jesuit secondary schools in India